Neurigona is a genus of flies in the family Dolichopodidae. It is a large genus, with over 150 known species.

Gallery

Species

Neurigona abdominalis (Fallén, 1823)
Neurigona aestiva Van Duzee, 1913
Neurigona alajuela Naglis, 2003
Neurigona albitarsis Naglis, 2003
Neurigona albospinosa Van Duzee, 1913
Neurigona aldrichi Van Duzee, 1913
Neurigona americana Parent, 1934
Neurigona angulata De Meijere, 1916
Neurigona anomaloptera Negrobov, 1987
Neurigona aragua Naglis, 2003
Neurigona arcuata Van Duzee, 1913
Neurigona argentifacies Naglis, 2003
Neurigona australis Van Duzee, 1913
Neurigona banksi Van Duzee, 1929
Neurigona basalis Yang & Saigusa, 2005
Neurigona bicolor Van Duzee, 1933
Neurigona biflexa Strobl, 1909
Neurigona bimaculata Yang & Saigusa, 2005
Neurigona bivittata Van Duzee, 1913
Neurigona borneoensis Parent, 1935
Neurigona brevitibia Naglis, 2003
Neurigona bullata Negrobov, 1987
Neurigona californica Harmston, 1972
Neurigona cantareira Naglis, 2003
Neurigona carbonifer (Loew, 1870)
Neurigona centralis Yang & Saigusa, 2001
Neurigona chetitarsa Parent, 1926
Neurigona ciliata Van Duzee, 1913
Neurigona cilimanus Van Duzee, 1925
Neurigona cilipes (Oldenberg, 1904)
Neurigona composita Becker, 1922
Neurigona concaviuscula Yang, 1999
Neurigona crinitarsis Naglis, 2003
Neurigona dahli Becker, 1922
Neurigona davshinica Negrobov, 1987
Neurigona deformis Van Duzee, 1913
Neurigona denudata Becker, 1922
Neurigona dimidiata (Loew, 1861)
Neurigona disjuncta Van Duzee, 1913
Neurigona dobrogica Parvu, 1996
Neurigona elongata Wang in Wang, Yang & Zhang, 2019
Neurigona erichsoni (Zetterstedt, 1843)
Neurigona euchroma Negrobov, 1987
Neurigona exemta Becker, 1922
Neurigona febrilata Negrobov & Fursov, 1988
Neurigona flava Van Duzee, 1913
Neurigona flavella Negrobov, 1987
Neurigona floridula Wheeler, 1899
Neurigona fuscalaris Harmston, 1968
Neurigona fuscicosta Robinson, 1975
Neurigona gemina Becker, 1922
Neurigona georgiana Harmston & Knowlton, 1963
Neurigona grisea Parent, 1944
Neurigona grossa Negrobov, 1987
Neurigona grossicauda Van Duzee, 1931
Neurigona guanacasta Naglis, 2003
Neurigona guangdongensis Wang, Yang & Grootaert, 2007
Neurigona guangxiensis Yang, 1999
Neurigona guizhouensis Wang, Yang & Grootaert, 2007
Neurigona hachaensis Naglis, 2003
Neurigona hainana Wang, Chen & Yang, 2010
Neurigona hauseri Wang in Wang, Yang & Zhang, 2019
Neurigona helva Negrobov & Tsurikov, 1990
Neurigona henana Wang, Yang & Grootaert, 2007
Neurigona jacobsoni Hollis, 1964
Neurigona jiangsuensis Wang, Yang & Grootaert, 2007
Neurigona kasparyani Negrobov, 1987
Neurigona lamellata Naglis, 2003
Neurigona latifacies Naglis, 2003
Neurigona lenae Capellari, 2013
Neurigona lienosa Wheeler, 1899
Neurigona limonensis Naglis, 2003
Neurigona lineata (Oldenberg, 1904)
Neurigona lobata Parent, 1935
Neurigona longipalpa Naglis, 2003
Neurigona longipes Becker, 1918
Neurigona longiseta Wang in Wang, Yang & Zhang, 2019
Neurigona longitarsis Naglis, 2003
Neurigona lopesi Silva, Capellari & Oliveira, 2022
Neurigona maculata Van Duzee, 1913
Neurigona maculosa Naglis, 2003
Neurigona magnipalpa Naglis, 2003
Neurigona manauara Capellari, 2013
Neurigona melini Frey, 1928
Neurigona meironensis Grichanov, 2010
Neurigona micra Naglis, 2003
Neurigona micropyga Negrobov, 1987
Neurigona mongolensis Negrobov & Fursov, 1985
Neurigona montebello Naglis, 2003
Neurigona nervosa Naglis, 2003
Neurigona nigrimanus Van Duzee, 1930
Neurigona nigritibialis Robinson, 1964
Neurigona ninae Negrobov, 1987
Neurigona nitida Van Duzee, 1913
Neurigona nubifera (Loew, 1869)
Neurigona obscurata Naglis, 2003
Neurigona orbicularis Becker, 1922
Neurigona ornata Van Duzee, 1930
Neurigona ornatipes Parent, 1934
Neurigona pallida (Fallén, 1823)
Neurigona papaveroi Silva, Capellari & Oliveira, 2022
Neurigona pectinata Becker, 1922
Neurigona pectinulata Parent, 1935
Neurigona pectoralis Van Duzee, 1913
Neurigona perbrevis Van Duzee, 1913
Neurigona perplexa Van Duzee, 1913
Neurigona persiana Pollet & Kazerani, 2022
Neurigona pitilla Naglis, 2003
Neurigona planipes Van Duzee, 1925
Neurigona plumitarsis Naglis, 2003
Neurigona pressitarsis Naglis, 2003
Neurigona procera Naglis, 2003
Neurigona pseudobanksi Naglis, 2003
Neurigona pseudolongipes Negrobov, 1987
Neurigona pullata Negrobov & Fursov, 1988
Neurigona punctifera Becker, 1907
Neurigona purulha Naglis, 2003
Neurigona qingchengshana Yang & Saigusa, 2001
Neurigona quadrifasciata (Fabricius, 1781)
Neurigona rubella (Loew, 1861)
Neurigona scutitarsis Robinson, 1970
Neurigona semilata Negrobov & Fursov, 1988
Neurigona sergii Negrobov & Fursov, 1988
Neurigona shaanxiensis Yang & Saigusa, 2005
Neurigona shennongjiana Yang, 1999
Neurigona sichuana Wang, Chen & Yang, 2010
Neurigona signata Parent, 1932
Neurigona signifer Aldrich, 1896
Neurigona sirena Naglis, 2003
Neurigona smithi Robinson, 1970
Neurigona solodovnikovi Grichanov, 2010
Neurigona spiculifera Robinson, 1970
Neurigona squamifera Parent, 1935
Neurigona starki Naglis, 2003
Neurigona subcilipes Negrobov & Fursov, 1988
Neurigona subnervosa Naglis, 2003
Neurigona suturalis (Fallén, 1823)
Neurigona tarsalis Van Duzee, 1913
Neurigona tatjanae Negrobov, 1987
Neurigona tatumbia Naglis, 2003
Neurigona temasek Grootaert & Foo, 2019
Neurigona tenuicauda Naglis, 2003
Neurigona tenuis (Loew, 1864)
Neurigona terminalis Van Duzee, 1925
Neurigona timahensis Grootaert & Foo, 2019
Neurigona tingua Silva, Capellari & Oliveira, 2022
Neurigona torrida Harmston, 1951
Neurigona transversa Van Duzee, 1913
Neurigona tridens Van Duzee, 1913
Neurigona unicalcarata Negrobov & Fursov, 1988
Neurigona unicinata Negrobov & Fursov, 1988
Neurigona unicolor Oldenberg, 1916
Neurigona uralensis Becker, 1918
Neurigona valgusa Harmston & Rapp, 1968
Neurigona ventralis Yang & Saigusa, 2005
Neurigona wui Wang, Yang & Grootaert, 2007
Neurigona xiaolongmensis Wang, Yang & Grootaert, 2007
Neurigona xiangshana Yang, 1999
Neurigona xizangensis Yang, 1999
Neurigona xui Zhang, Yang & Grootaert, 2003
Neurigona yacambo Naglis, 2003
Neurigona yaoi Wang, Chen & Yang, 2010
Neurigona yunnana Wang, Yang & Grootaert, 2007
Neurigona zhangae Wang, Yang & Grootaert, 2006
Neurigona zhejiangensis Yang, 1999
Neurigona zionensis Harmston & Knowlton, 1942

The following are regarded as nomina dubia:
Neurigona brasiliensis (Schiner, 1868)
Neurigona cinereicollis (Van der Wulp, 1888)
Neurigona derelicta Parent, 1928
Neurigona lamprostetha (Philippi, 1865)

References

Nearctic

Dolichopodidae genera
Neurigoninae
Articles containing video clips
Diptera of Asia
Diptera of Europe
Diptera of North America
Diptera of South America
Taxa named by Camillo Rondani